Lejla Njemčević (born 19 June 1994) is an Italian-born Bosnian cross-country and mountain bike cyclist. She is the first cross country cyclist from Bosnia and Herzegovina to sign a contract for a professional cycling team. Lejla started racing at the age of 15 at local cycling club Klub brdskog biciklizma "Puls" for which team she is still riding. She is an eleven time national champion in various disciplines and four time national league overall winner, for the years 2016, 2017, 2018 and 2019 and also two time silver medal winner in the Balkan championship.

Results

Lejla is Bosnia and Herzegovina national champion at: cross-country (XCO), cross-country marathon (XCM), and cross-country eliminator (XCE). She has also won titles in the 2014 national road cycling championships. 
Lejla Njemčević is a graduated student of Faculty of Law in Sarajevo with a master's degree in criminal law.

Career
Lejla Njemčević grew up in Sarajevo, while very young she showed passion for sport and cycling. After intense searching for a mountain bike racing club she started training with Amar Njemčević, one of the best cycling and condition coaches in Bosnia and Herzegovina. After a few years of racing in national races, Tanović started her professional and international career in 2013. She signed a professional contract with Turkish cycling team Salcano Cappadocia in 2014. Lejla won three medals on Balkan championship races, in 2014 she was second in Macedonia and also winning second place in Greece in 2015. But in 2016 she won first gold medal in elite category for Bosnia and Herzegovina on Balkan championship in Montenegro. After that victory she became most successful mountain bike rider in history of Bosnia and Herzegovina. After season 2015 and 2016 where she was riding for Salcano team from Turkey she signed for SMF Team from Greece for season 2017. In season 2017 Tanović defended  her Balkan champion title in Nafpaktos (Greece), this was her second straight time that she won Balkan title in elite category. In 2018, Tanović defended her Balkan championship title at competition held in Romania  After her third successful Balkan championship defence, she won her fourth consecutive Balkan championship in 2019 in Serbia.

References

External links
 profile at Mtbcrosscountry.com
 profile at Procyclingstats.com

Bosnia and Herzegovina female cyclists
Living people
Place of birth missing (living people)
1994 births
Cyclists at the 2015 European Games
European Games competitors for Bosnia and Herzegovina